St. Paul's Episcopal Church is a historic Episcopal church at Old York and Ashbourne Roads in Elkins Park, Cheltenham Township, Montgomery County, Pennsylvania. It was originally built in 1861, and is a gray stone church in the Gothic style. The church was conceived by noted financier Jay Cooke (1821–1905), along with John W. Thomas, J.F. Peniston and William C. Houston.  Its size was doubled with an expansion in 1870, and a 60-foot-tall tower added.  A transept was added in 1883, and the two-story parish hall wing in 1891.  Architect Horace Trumbauer (1868–1938) made some refinements to the church during the 1897 to 1924 period. The main sanctuary of the church features 13 stained glass windows from Tiffany studios.

Also on the property is the -story rectory built in 1868 and a stable. Jay Cooke Memorial hall (1906), and sexton's cottage (1923), were designed by architects Churchman & Thomas and Thomas, Martin & Kirkpatrick, respectively. (See Walter Horstmann Thomas.)  Adjacent to the church is a cemetery laid out in 1879 and expanded in 1905. Located in the cemetery is the Jay Cooke mausoleum.

St. Paul's Episcopal Church was added to the National Register of Historic Places in 1982.

Saint Paul's remains an active parish. The church's sister organization, The Friends of St. Paul's Elkins Park, hosts a popular concert series featuring music from several genres including classical, jazz, and gospel.

Gallery

References

Cemeteries in Montgomery County, Pennsylvania
Episcopal churches in Pennsylvania
Churches on the National Register of Historic Places in Pennsylvania
Gothic Revival church buildings in Pennsylvania
Churches completed in 1861
19th-century Episcopal church buildings
Churches in Montgomery County, Pennsylvania
Elkins Park, Pennsylvania
1861 establishments in Pennsylvania
National Register of Historic Places in Montgomery County, Pennsylvania